Vauxhall Vivaro, a light commercial vehicle also sold outside the United Kingdom as the Opel Vivaro, may refer to:

The Vauxhall Vivaro 1, based on the second generation Renault Trafic,  was produced between 2001 and 2014
The Vauxhall Vivaro 2, based on the third generation Renault Trafic,  was produced between 2014 and 2018
The Vauxhall Vivaro 3, which is based on the third generation Citroën Dispatch, is currently produced from 2019